Royal Lodge is a Grade II listed house in Windsor Great Park in Berkshire, England, half a mile north of Cumberland Lodge and  south of Windsor Castle. Part of the Crown Estate, it was the Windsor residence of Queen Elizabeth The Queen Mother from 1952 until she died there in 2002, at the age of 101. In 2004 it became the official country residence of Prince Andrew, Duke of York, and his family. In 2023 it was reported that Andrew had been offered the smaller five-bedroom Frogmore Cottage instead, until then the UK residence of Prince Harry, Duke of Sussex and his family, who had been issued with an eviction notice by Buckingham Palace.

History

Royal Lodge dates originally from the mid-seventeenth century, there being a house on the site by 1662. By 1750, the small Queen Anne style brick house was being used in conjunction with the adjacent dairy. By this time, it was known variously as the Lower Lodge, to distinguish it from Cumberland Lodge, then known as the Great Lodge, or the Dairy Lodge.

From the mid-eighteenth century, it was home to the military topographer and artist Thomas Sandby (brother of the better known Paul), as Deputy Ranger of the Great Park. The house was then known as the Deputy Ranger's House.

It was enlarged by 1792 and was the home of Joseph Frost, the Park Bailiff, and then of the General Superintendent of Farms, after Sandby's death.

George, Prince of Wales (later King George IV), planned to rebuild Cumberland Lodge after  becoming prince regent. He used the Lower Lodge as temporary accommodation in 1812. Alterations and additions were undertaken by John Nash for George.

The chapels of Royal and Cumberland Lodges proved too small for the royal households in the early 19th century, and the Royal Chapel of All Saints was built in 1825 by Jeffry Wyatville, less than a hundred yards from Royal Lodge.
 
It was now a large and elaborate cottage in the contemporary style of the cottage orné, with thatched roofs, verandas, and a conservatory. It became known as the Prince Regent's Cottage after the prince moved into it in 1815. The renovation of Cumberland Lodge was abandoned.

Additions were made after 1820. In 1823, Jeffry Wyatt (later Sir Jeffry Wyatville) succeeded Nash as architect, and the house (known now as the "King's Cottage") became known as Royal Lodge in the late 1820s.

After 1830, King William IV ordered the demolition of all of the house, except the conservatory. It became a residence again in 1840, and was used as accommodation for various officers of the Royal Household until 1843, and from 1873 to 1931.

The grounds extend to 98 acres (40 hectares), partly under its own head gardener, but mostly the responsibility of the Crown Estates Commissioners. While the house has grown piecemeal since the 1840s, and remains relatively small and informal, the grounds have a unifying plan. This was the result of work undertaken by the Duke and Duchess of York in the 1930s, with the assistance of Sir Eric Savill, of the Windsor Estate.

In 1931, King George V granted Royal Lodge to the Duke and Duchess of York (later King George VI and Queen Elizabeth) as a country retreat. Wings were added on each flank in the 1930s. There are two lodges at the entrance, and groups of three cottages each side of the lodges. The main building has some 30 rooms, including 7 bedrooms, and a saloon. The original conservatory survives. The grounds contain the miniature cottage Y Bwthyn Bach, a gift to Princess Elizabeth as a child from the people of Wales in 1932.

King George VI and Queen Elizabeth and their daughters Princesses Elizabeth (later Queen Elizabeth II) and Margaret were depicted in Royal Lodge in Herbert James Gunn's 1950 painting Conversation Piece at Royal Lodge, Windsor.

After the death of her husband George VI in 1952, the Queen Mother continued to use the house as one of her country retreats as a grace and favour residence until her death. The Queen Mother died at Royal Lodge in March 2002, with her daughter, Queen Elizabeth II, by her side.

Lease to Prince Andrew, Duke of York 

In August 2003, Prince Andrew, Duke of York was granted a lease agreement by the Crown Estate for 75 years. The property leased included Royal Lodge, a Gardener's Cottage, the Chapel Lodge, six Lodge Cottages, and police security accommodation in addition to 40 hectares of land.

The lease agreement required Prince Andrew to carry out, at his own expense, refurbishments under-estimated at £7.5 million at September 2002 prices, excluding VAT. It also provided for a premium payment of £1 million.

The National Audit Office (NAO) report into the lease agreement stated that the Crown Estate's independent advisors had advised that the refurbishment work would cost at least £5 million and that the prince should be given the option to buy out the notional annual rental payment (set at £260,000) for £2.5 million.

Once the prince committed to spending £7.5 million on refurbishment, it was decided that no rental would be required as he would be treated as having effectively bought out the notional annual rental payment because he exceeded the minimum £5 million required for refurbishment. As a result, only the £1 million premium was paid to the Crown Estate.

There is no provision for any further rent review over the life of the 75-year lease agreement (unlike the rent reviews provided in the case of Bagshot Park, residence of Prince Edward, Duke of Edinburgh , also leased from the Crown Estate).

The lease agreement provides that the prince may not benefit financially from any increase in the value of the property as the freehold belongs to the Crown Estate. The leasehold may be assigned only to his widow or his two daughters, Princess Beatrice of York and Princess Eugenie of York, or a trust established solely for their benefit.

If the prince terminates the lease, the property reverts to the Crown Estate. He would be entitled to compensation for the refurbishment costs incurred up to a maximum of just under £7 million, which is reduced annually over the first 25 years, after which no compensation is payable.

The NAO report states that having already taken advice from one independent advisor on the transaction, the Crown Estate appointed a second firm of independent advisors to assess the details of the lease deal, given its importance. The second independent advisor concluded that the deal was appropriate having regard to the need to maintain management control over Royal Lodge and because of the security implications (particularly concerning the Royal Family's access to the Royal Chapel). In the circumstances, the Crown Estate considered that the requirement to obtain value for money was satisfied, taking into account the non-financial considerations relating to the lease of the property. The alternative use, to lease it on the commercial market, was not possible.   
   
Following the renovations, Prince Andrew with his two daughters moved into the house in 2004, having vacated Sunninghill Park. In 2008, his former wife Sarah, Duchess of York moved into Royal Lodge, again sharing a house with the Duke of York. It has been reported that the open market value of the property would have been at least £30 million as of January 2022.

After the Duke of York stepped down from public duties in November 2019, the flagpole on the roof of Royal Lodge was removed. The flagpole was previously used to fly the personal Royal Standard of the Duke of York when in residence.

In 2023 reports suggested that King Charles III was to cut Andrew's annual grant, potentially leaving him unable to afford the Lodge's running costs, and had been offered the smaller five-bedroom Frogmore Cottage instead, until then the UK residence of Prince Harry, Duke of Sussex and his family, who had been issued with an eviction notice by Buckingham Palace.

References

17th-century establishments in England
Houses completed in the 17th century
Buildings and structures in Windsor Great Park
Country houses in Berkshire
Grade II listed houses
Grade II listed buildings in Berkshire
Jeffry Wyatville buildings
John Nash buildings
Royal residences in England
Regency architecture in England
Prince Andrew, Duke of York
Queen Elizabeth The Queen Mother